Twyford and Stenson is a civil parish in the South Derbyshire district of Derbyshire, England.  The parish contains twelve listed buildings that are recorded in the National Heritage List for England. Of these, one is listed at Grade I, the highest of the three grades, one is at Grade II*, the middle grade, and the others are at Grade II, the lowest grade.  The parish contains the villages of Twyford and Stenson and the surrounding countryside.  The Trent and Mersey Canal runs through the north of the parish, and the listed buildings associated with it are bridges, a lock and a cottage.  The other listed buildings are a church, houses, cottages and associated structures, and farmhouses and farm buildings.


Key

Buildings

References

Citations

Sources

 

Lists of listed buildings in Derbyshire